De Gulle Minnaar  is a 1990 Dutch comedy film drama directed by Mady Saks.

Cast
Peter Faber ...  Peter Heg
Mariska Van Kolck ...  Mascha Silman
Ella van Drumpt ...  Kiki
Ian Smith ...  Tommie
Lieneke le Roux ...  Oekje
Sylvia Millecam ...  Hedda
Adèle Bloemendaal ...  Pina Overgauw
Herbert Flack ...  Jimmy
Maarten Spanjer ...  Freek
Rik Launspach ...  Lucas
Frank Groothof ...  Freddy
Lex de Regt ...  Kalewijn
Hans Beijer ...  Van der Leeuw (as Hans Beyer)
Hester van de Vijver ...  Beatrijs
Sylvie Allard ...  Jessica

External links 
 

Dutch comedy films
1990 films
1990s Dutch-language films
1990 comedy films
Films produced by Rob Houwer